Georgios Manousakis (born 10 April 1998) is a Greek professional footballer who plays as a striker for Super League 2 club Chania.

Career statistics

References

1998 births
Living people
Gamma Ethniki players
Football League (Greece) players
Super League Greece 2 players
Super League Greece players
Ergotelis F.C. players
PAS Lamia 1964 players
Iraklis Thessaloniki F.C. players
Association football forwards
Footballers from Heraklion
Greek footballers